Year 1391 (MCCCXCI) was a common year starting on Sunday (link will display full calendar) of the Julian calendar.

Events 
 January–December 
 June 6 – Massacre of 1391: Anti-Jewish pogroms erupt in Seville, Spain. Many thousands of Jews are massacred, and the violence spreads throughout Spain and Portugal, especially to Toledo, Barcelona and Mallorca. This event marks a turning-point in the history of the Spanish Jews, with most of the survivors leaving the Iberian Peninsula or being forced to convert.  
 July 18 – Tokhtamysh–Timur war – Battle of the Kondurcha River: Timur defeats Tokhtamysh of the Golden Horde, in present day southeast Russia.

 Date unknown 
 Manuel II Palaiologos becomes Byzantine emperor after his father, John V Palaiologos, dies of a nervous breakdown, due to his continued humiliation by the Ottoman Empire.
 Yusuf II succeeds Muhammed V, as Nasrid Sultan of Granada (now southern Spain).
 Stephen Dabiša succeeds Stephen Tvrtko I, as King of Bosnia.
 Shah Mansur becomes leader of the Timurid-occupied Muzaffarid Empire, in central Persia.
 A group of Muzaffarids under Zafar Khan Muzaffar establish a new Sultanate at Gujarat, in western India. 
 Vytautas the Great, claimant to the throne of Lithuania, forms an alliance with Muscovy.
 Roman I succeeds Petru, as Prince of Moldavia (now Moldova and northeastern Romania).
 Konrad von Wallenrode succeeds Konrad Zöllner von Rotenstein, as Grand Master of the Teutonic Knights.
 Bridget of Sweden is canonized by Pope Boniface IX.
 Ushkuinik pirates from Novgorod sack the Muscovy towns of Zhukotin and Kazan.
 The Chinese invent toilet paper for use by their emperors.
 Henry I Sinclair, Earl of Orkney, takes control of the Shetland Islands and the Faroe Islands.
 The University of Ferrara is founded on the Italian Peninsula.
 The Ming government orders 50 million trees planted in the Nanjing area.

Births 
 October 31 – Edward, King of Portugal (d. 1438)
 November 6 – Edmund Mortimer, 5th Earl of March, English politician (d. 1425)
 Gedun Drub, 1st Dalai Lama (d. 1474)
 Joan of France, Duchess of Brittany  (d. 1433)
 Thomas West, 2nd Baron West (d. 1415)

Deaths 
 January 16 – Emir Muhammed V of Granada (b. 1338)
 February 16 – John V Palaiologos, Byzantine emperor (b. 1332)
 March 10 – King Tvrtko I of Bosnia (b. 1338)
 November 1 – Amadeus VII, Count of Savoy (b. 1360)
 Gaston III, Count of Foix, co-prince of Andorra
 date unknown
 Petru, Prince of Moldavia
 Margaret, Countess of Mar (approximate date)

References